Bismillah is a phrase in Arabic meaning "in the name of Allah". It is also the first word in the Qur'an, and refers to the Qur'an's opening phrase, the Basmala. It may also refer to:

People
Bismillah Khan (1916–2006), Indian classical musician
Bismillah (Guantanamo detainee 658), Afghan, former Guantanamo detainee (ISN 658)
Bismaullah, Afghan, former Guantanamo detainee (ISN 960)
Haji Bismullah, Afghan, former Guantanamo detainee (ISN 968)
Bismillah Khan Mohammadi (born 1961), Afghan politician
Bismillah Afghanmal (born 1971), Afghan politician
Abdul Bismillah (born 1949), Indian novelist writing in Hindi
Bismillah Jan Shinwari (born 1984), Afghan cricket umpire

Other
Bismillah Airlines, Bangladesh 
Bismillah Chowk, neighbourhood in Karachi, Pakistan
Bismullah v. Gates, United States Court of Appeal case, on behalf of Haji Bismullah, Guantanamo detainee 968, an Afghan
"Bismillah!", a lyric from the Queen song "Bohemian Rhapsody"
Bismillah (film), a Bengali-language musical drama
Bismillah (1925 film), Soviet Azerbaijani propaganda silent film